James Avery (1620April 18, 1700) was an American colonial landowner, legislator, and a military commander in King Philip's War.

Early life
Avery was born in Cornwall, England and emigrated to Massachusetts Bay Colony as a child with his parents. As an adult he received several land grants in the vicinity of New London, in Connecticut.

Pioneer
Avery was among Stonington, Connecticut’s early settlers, for whom Avery Point is named. A monument stands on the location of his 1656 home in Groton, called The Hive of the Averys. The home burned down in a fire started from an ember of a passing train on July 20, 1894.

General Assembly
He was Deputy to the General Court of Connecticut 12 times from 1656 to 1680.  He also served for 20 years as a town selectman.

Military service
Avery was a captain in the colonial militia,  In the Great Swamp Fight, a battle at Kingston, Rhode Island on December 19, 1675. Avery commanded a group of allied Pequot Natives, in a battle against natives' fighting for rights and land.

Avery served as a captain in command of forty Englishmen from Stonington, Lyme, and New London in 1676. He also served as captain of one of four companies which protected the frontier.

Descendants
Avery has thousands of living descendants.  Among his descendants are John D. Rockefeller Sr., Governor and Vice President Nelson Rockefeller, Senator Jay Rockefeller, Academy Award-winning screenwriter & director Roger Avary.

References

External links

John Frederic Randall, Member of...
More About Capt. James Avery
Biography of Captain James Avery...

1620 births
1700 deaths
People of colonial Connecticut
People from Groton, Connecticut
People of Cornish descent
Kingdom of England emigrants to Massachusetts Bay Colony
Deputies of the Connecticut General Court (1639–1662)
Deputies of the Connecticut General Assembly (1662–1698)
King Philip's War